በጎፋ ዞን የገዜ ጎፋ ወረዳ አስተዳደር gofa zone geze gofa woreda administration website

https://www.gofazonegezegofaw.gov.et

Geze Gofa is one of the woredas in the Southern Nations, Nationalities, and Peoples' Region of Ethiopia. Part of the Gamo Gofa Zone, Geze Gofa is bordered on the south by Oyda, on the west by Basketo special woreda, on the northwest by Melokoza, and on the east by Demba Gofa. Towns in Geze Gofa include Bulki. Geze Gofa was part of former Gofa Zuria woreda.

Geze Gofa Zone Zuria Woreda Website

Demographics 
Based on the 2007 Census conducted by the CSA, this woreda has a total population of 68,650, of whom 34,078 are men and 34,572 women; 5,742 or 8.36% of its population are urban dwellers. The majority of the inhabitants were Protestants, with 63.17% of the population reporting that belief, 33.49% practiced Ethiopian Orthodox Christianity, 1.44% were Muslim, and 1.15% practiced traditional beliefs.

Notes 

Districts of the Southern Nations, Nationalities, and Peoples' Region